LIPU, the Lega italiana protezione uccelli (En. “Italian League for Bird Protection”) is an Italian charitable organisation, founded in 1965 and devoted to the protection of the country's wildlife with a particular focus on birds. It has a membership of 42,000 and is the Italian partner of BirdLife International. Moreover, it is one of the most important Italian environmentalist organizations with WWF Italia, Legambiente and Greenpeace Italia.

Its activities fall broadly within four main areas
 Species protection, including action against illegal shooting and trapping of birds
 The conservation and development of habitats important for species conservation
 Environmental education and the raising of public awareness over wildlife and conservation issues
 Lobbying for changes in Italian and EU law—or for the more rigorous application of existing law—related to wildlife protection.

External links
 Official site 
 LIPU UK , the British society of LIPU supporters.
 Lega italiana protezione uccelli , the article on LIPU from the BirdLife International website.

Environmental organizations established in 1965
Ornithological organizations
Animal welfare organisations based in Italy
Nature conservation in Italy
Bird conservation organizations
1965 establishments in Italy